The 1930 Belgian Grand Prix (formally the II Grand Prix de Belgique), also known as the VII Grand Prix d'Europe was a Grand Prix motor race held at Spa-Francorchamps on 20 July 1930. The race was held over 40 laps of a 14.914 km circuit for a total race distance of 596.560 km and was won by Louis Chiron driving a Bugatti.

Classification

References

External links

Belgian Grand Prix
Belgian Grand Prix
Grand Prix